The Estévez Palace (Spanish: Palacio Estévez) is a building situated in Plaza Independencia, Montevideo, Uruguay, designed in a combination of Doric and Colonial styles by Manoel de Castel in 1873. It has served as the working place of the President of Uruguay and has been eventually converted to a museum, housing artifacts and mementos of the Uruguayan presidency and its office holders.

It was owned by don Francisco Estévez and his family until it was acquired by the Uruguayan government in 1880, when it was established as the working place of president Lorenzo Latorre in 1890.

After the restoration of democracy in 1985, president Julio María Sanguinetti moved the seat of the Executive Power to the Liberty Building, which had served before as the Ministry of Defence. During the government of Tabaré Vázquez the seat was moved to the Torre Ejecutiva, which is next to the Estévez Palace.

References 

Buildings and structures in Montevideo
Museums in Montevideo
History museums in Uruguay
Government of Uruguay
Houses completed in 1874
Ciudad Vieja, Montevideo
Neoclassical architecture in Uruguay